Simon Ammann (born 25 June 1981) is a Swiss ski jumper. He is one of the most successful athletes in the history of the sport, having won four individual Winter Olympic gold medals in 2002 and 2010. His other achievements include winning the 2007 Ski Jumping World Championships, the 2010 Ski Flying World Championships, the 2010 Nordic Tournament, and the 2010 Ski Jumping World Cup overall title.

Career 
Ammann made his debut at the age of 16 during the 1997–98 FIS Ski Jumping World Cup season. He qualified for the 1998 Olympic Games in Nagano, Japan, where he finished 35th.

Before the 2002 Winter Olympics in Salt Lake City, Ammann crashed and suffered injuries during training in Willingen. Despite this, he won a gold medal in both the individual normal hill and large hill competitions, being only the second athlete to accomplish this feat (Matti Nykänen having done so in 1988). During the Olympics, Ammann gained international attention not only for his victories but also for his youthful and bespectacled appearance on the podium that many compared to Harry Potter. In addition to acquiring Swiss stardom he also made appearances on American talk shows, such as the Late Show with David Letterman (on 20 February 2002).

Ammann also won the ski jumping event at the Holmenkollen Ski Festival in 2002 and 2007. This earned him the Holmenkollen medal in 2007 (shared with Frode Estil, Odd-Bjørn Hjelmeset, King Harald V, and Queen Sonja of Norway).

He made his third Olympic appearance in 2006 in Turin, Italy.

On 24 February 2007, he won his first medal at the FIS Nordic World Ski Championships with a victory in the Individual Large Hill in Sapporo, Japan. Ammann would follow this with a silver medal in the Individual Normal Hill the following week. Ammann would complete his set of medals with a bronze medal in the Individual Normal Hill event at the FIS Nordic World Ski Championships 2009 in Liberec, Czech Republic.

In 2010, competing in his fourth Olympics in Vancouver, British Columbia, Canada, Ammann won the gold medal in the Individual Normal Hill event. He became the first man in Olympic history to win gold medals in the Individual Normal Hill event in two Olympics.

On 20 February 2010, he also won a gold medal in the Individual Large Hill event at the Winter Olympics in Vancouver, thus becoming the first man to win gold medals in both individual ski jumping events in two Olympic games, as well as the most decorated Swiss Olympic athlete of all time.  His first jump was 144 meters.  His second jump was 138 meters.

In March 2010, Ammann became the overall winner of 2009–10 FIS Ski Jumping World Cup, winning all four events at the Nordic Tournament and nine World Cup events in one season overall. He finished the season by becoming the ski flying World Champion in Planica on the largest hill in the world. His 236.5 m fourth round jump was the longest jump of the event and then the second longest jump in history.

He won his most recent gold medal on the FIS World Cup circuit in December 2013. He was selected as flag-bearer of the Swiss Winter Olympics team in Sochi, Russia, in February 2014.

The 2014 Winter Olympics in Sochi were disappointing for Ammann. He called a news conference, and there was a lot of buzz that he would announce his retirement. However, he merely talked about how it was too early to decide.

On 6 January 2015, Ammann was injured on his second-round jump in Bischofshofen during the final stage of the 2014–15 Four Hills Tournament. His representation has since stated that his condition is stable, with the most damage being to his face. The Four Hills tournament was a tough outing overall for Ammann, as he also fell in the first round in Oberstdorf.

Ammann also competed in the 2018 and 2022 Winter Olympics, with his best finish being eleventh place in the normal hill event in 2018.

World Cup

Standings

Wins

Personal life 
Simon Ammann was born in Grabs, Switzerland to Margit and Heinrich Ammann and raised in Unterwasser, Switzerland. He has two brothers and three sisters. He married Yana Yanovskaya in 2010.

See also 
 List of Olympic medalists in ski jumping
 List of FIS Nordic World Ski Championships medalists in ski jumping
 List of FIS Ski Flying World Championships medalists in ski flying

References

External links 

 Official home page

1981 births
Living people
Holmenkollen medalists
Holmenkollen Ski Festival winners
ETH Zurich alumni
Ski jumpers at the 1998 Winter Olympics
Ski jumpers at the 2002 Winter Olympics
Ski jumpers at the 2006 Winter Olympics
Ski jumpers at the 2010 Winter Olympics
Ski jumpers at the 2014 Winter Olympics
Ski jumpers at the 2018 Winter Olympics
Ski jumpers at the 2022 Winter Olympics
Swiss male ski jumpers
Olympic gold medalists for Switzerland
Olympic ski jumpers of Switzerland
Olympic medalists in ski jumping
FIS Nordic World Ski Championships medalists in ski jumping
Medalists at the 2010 Winter Olympics
Medalists at the 2002 Winter Olympics